Denice is a comune (municipality) in the Province of Alessandria in the Italian region Piedmont, located about  southeast of Turin and about  southwest of Alessandria.

Denice borders the following municipalities: Mombaldone, Monastero Bormida, Montechiaro d'Acqui, Ponti, and Roccaverano.

Demographic evolution

References

Cities and towns in Piedmont